El Cuy is a department of Río Negro Province (Argentina).

Villages 

 Aguada Guzmán
 El Cuy (seat of the department)

References 

Departments of Río Negro Province